is a Japanese video game producer. He worked previously as a programmer and producer for Konami and was also CEO of the now-defunct Konami Computer Entertainment Kobe branch. His works include the Nintendo Entertainment System versions of Contra and Life Force, the Legend of the Mystical Ninja series, Rakugakids, and some games in the Castlevania series. He currently leads Good Feel Co., Ltd., which is a Japanese video game developer that developed Wario Land: Shake It!, a game that was released for the Wii in 2008.

Works

Nintendo Entertainment System
Ganbare Goemon! Karakuri Dōchū - Programmer
Life Force - Director/Programmer
Contra - Director/Programmer
Blades of Steel - Director/Programmer
Gradius II - Director/Programmer
Super C - Director/Programmer
Moai-kun - Director

Super NES
The Legend of the Mystical Ninja - Director/Programmer
Tiny Toon Adventures: Buster Busts Loose! - Programmer
Ganbare Goemon 2: Kiteretsu Shogun Magginesu - Producer/Planner
Gokujō Parodius! ～Kako no Eikō o Motomete～ - Producer
Ganbare Goemon 3: Shishijūrokubē no Karakuri Manji Gatame - Producer/Programmer
Jikkyō Oshaberi Parodius - Producer
Ganbare Goemon Kirakira Dōchū: Boku ga Dancer ni Natta Wake - Producer

Nintendo 64
Mystical Ninja Starring Goemon - Producer
Susume! Taisen Puzzle Dama: Tōkon! Marutama Machi - Producer
Rakugakids - Producer
Castlevania - Executive Producer
Goemon: Mononoke Sugoroku - Executive Producer
Castlevania: Legacy of Darkness - Executive Producer

Game Boy Color
 Ganbare Goemon: Mononoke Douchuu Tobidase Nabe-Bugyou! - Executive Producer
 Tokimeki Memorial Pocket: Culture Hen - Executive Producer

PlayStation
Jikkyō Oshaberi Parodius: Forever With Me -  Producer
Ganbare Goemon: Oedo Daikaiten - Executive Producer

PlayStation 2
Goemon: Bouken Jidai Katsugeki - Executive Producer
Castlevania: Curse of Darkness - Executive Producer

Game Boy Advance
 Konami Krazy Racers - Executive Producer
 International Superstar Soccer Advance - Chief Producer

Nintendo DS
 Castlevania: Dawn of Sorrow - Executive Producer

Wii
Wario Land: Shake It! - Senior Producer
 Kirby's Epic Yarn - Senior Producer

Wii U
Yoshi's Woolly World - Senior Producer

References

1960 births
Japanese video game producers
Konami people
Living people